Highway 738 is a highway in the Canadian province of Saskatchewan. It runs from Highway 32 near Abbey to Highway 4.

Highway 738 connects with Highway 32 twice, the second time also connecting with Highway 37 near the town of Cabri.

See also 
Roads in Saskatchewan
Transportation in Saskatchewan

References 

738